Karl Litzmann (22 January 1850 – 28 May 1936) was a German World War I general and later Nazi Party member and state politician.

World War I
He is best known for his victory at the Battle of Łódź (1914); he earned the nickname "the Lion of Brzeziny" there. On 29 November 1914 he was awarded the "Pour le Mérite" for military bravery and Oak Leaves (signifying a second award) on 18 August 1915.

Interwar years
Litzmann became a member of Nazi Party in 1929 having previously become a member of SA; he was elected to the Reichstag in 1932 but declined to serve on grounds that he had responsibilities to the Prussian State Parliament, where he was its most senior member, also known as Father of the House or Alterspräsident.

Legacy
After the 1939 Nazi invasion of Poland, the towns of Łódź and Brzeziny were renamed in honour of Karl Litzmann. On 11 April 1940 Łódź was officially retitled by the occupying German forces as Litzmannstadt, while Brzeziny later became Löwenstadt (lion city). After World War II the towns reverted to their original Polish names.

Passau named a street after him.

Karl Litzmann was an Honorary Citizen of Neuruppin. The honorary citizenship was withdrawn in 2007.

He was the father of Karl-Siegmund Litzmann (1893-1945) who was General Commissioner for Estonia in the Reich Commissioner Ostland during the German occupation 1941 - 1944. He was also grandfather to Walter Lehweß-Litzmann (1907-1986).

References

External links
 
 

1850 births
1936 deaths
People from Oberhavel
Recipients of the Iron Cross (1870)
German Army generals of World War I
Nazi Party politicians
People from the Province of Brandenburg
Generals of Infantry (Prussia)
Recipients of the Pour le Mérite (military class)
Members of the Reichstag of the Weimar Republic
Members of the Reichstag of Nazi Germany
German military personnel of the Franco-Prussian War
Military personnel from Brandenburg